Nizam Uddin Ahmed is a Bangladesh Nationalist Party politician and a Member of Parliament from Bhola-2.

Career
Ahmed was elected to parliament from Bhola-2 as an Bangladesh Nationalist Party candidate in February 1996.

References

Bangladesh Nationalist Party politicians
Year of birth missing (living people)
6th Jatiya Sangsad members